Interstate 610 may refer to:
 Interstate 610 (Louisiana), an alternate in New Orleans, Louisiana
 Interstate 610 (Texas), a beltway around Houston, Texas

10-6
6